Choi Sung-eun (born June 17, 1996) is a South Korean actress. She is known for roles in television dramas such as SF8 (2020), Beyond Evil (2021), and The Sound of Magic (2022).

Early life and education 
Choi Sung-eun was born on June 17, 1996 in Seoul, South Korea. Choi’s family consists of her parents, an older brother, and a younger brother. She attended Kaywon High School of Arts under the Department of Theater and Film before getting admitted at the Korea National University of Arts' Acting Department in 2015.

Career

Beginnings
Choi started out acting in short films and as a theater actress at the Doosan Art Center. In 2018, she played the role of Autumn, a girl waiting for an organ transplant in the theater play Grain in the Blood. As a college student, Choi was featured as a cover of popular university magazine, Life Magazine College Tomorrow's 853 issue for 20s which drew the attention of industry officials and various management companies. In July 2018, Choi officially signed an exclusive contract with SALT Entertainment officially starting her career as a rookie actress.

2019 – present: Acting debut 
Choi landed her first major role in a feature film after passing an audition for the comedy film Start-Up (2019) where she played the role of red-haired girl So Kyung-joo. For her scene-stealing performance, she won Best New Actress from the Chunsa Film Festival and earned another nomination from the Buil Film Awards in South Korea.

In 2020, Choi appeared in the short film, Nipple War 3. In April of the same year, Choi made her CRT debut through the MBC drama SF8 : Joan's Galaxy (Ep. 3). Her first lead role in an independent film, Ten Months was also screened during the 21st Jeonju International Film Festival under the category "Korean Cinema". In August 2020, Choi signed an exclusive contract with Ace Factory.

In 2021, Choi joined the JTBC drama Beyond Evil as Manyang butcher shop owner, Yoo Jae-yi marking debut in a mini series. Following her moving performance as Yoo Jae-yi, Choi was nominated for the 57th Baeksang Arts Awards in the category Best New Actress – Television. In April, Choi joins the Netflix series The Sound of Magic, playing the role of Yoon Ah-yi alongside Ji Chang-wook and Hwang In-youp in her first main role in a drama series.  Later in August 2021, Choi was cast in the Wave's original film Gentleman as prosecutor Kim Hwa-jin, which is slated to premiere in 2022, alongside Joo Ji-hoon and Park Sung-woong.  Later in October, Choi's independent film, Ten Months was released commercially in cinemas.

Filmography

Film

Television series

Web series

Web shows

Discography

Singles

Theater

Awards and nominations

References

External links

 
 

1996 births
Living people
21st-century South Korean actresses
South Korean female models
South Korean television actresses
South Korean film actresses
Korea National University of Arts alumni